Bryshon Lorenzo Nellum (born May 1, 1989) is an American sprinter. He graduated from University of Southern California in 2012 with a degree in  Public Administration and Social Service Professions and is currently a graduate student.

Career
A native of Los Angeles, California, Nellum attended Long Beach Polytechnic High School, where he also competed in American football as a wide receiver, and was teammates with Terrence Austin, Jurrell Casey, Vaughn Telemaque, and Donovan Warren. He was ranked the No. 70 wide receiver prospect in his class by Rivals.com.

While still in high school, Nellum was named Gatorade Track & Field Athlete of the Year in 2007. In his sophomore year, Nellum finished second to David Gettis in the 400 meters at the 2005 CIF California State Meet. As a junior, he doubled as state champion in the 200 and 400 meters. At the 2007 CIF State Meet, Nellum repeated as 200 and 400 meters champion. In a memorable 200 metres dash, Nellum (state meet record 20.43) ran head-to-head with 100 meters champion Jahvid Best (20.65), narrowly beating him down the stretch. Nellum's and Best's time ranked No. 1 and No. 2 among high school sprinters in 2007, and earned Nellum a consecutive All-USA selection by USA Today. Nellum's time broke a twenty-year-old state record established by Quincy Watts in 1987.

Nellum had to redshirt the 2009 season at USC, after being shot in the leg by two gang members. Nellum was told by doctors that he would probably never again reach world-class speeds as a runner.

On June 24, 2012, in Eugene, Oregon, Bryshon Nellum ran a personal record 44.80—his first sub-45-second time—in the 400 meters at the U.S. Olympic track trials, placing third in the competition and earning a spot on the 2012 Olympic team. At the 2012 Olympics Nellum reached the semi-finals of the individual 400 meters and won a silver medal as part of the 4×400 meters relay team. He carried the US flag at the closing ceremony after being chosen by the US athletes.

References

External links
 
 
 
 
 
 
 Bryshon Nellum at DyeStat
 Bryshon Nellum at Rivals.com
 USC Trojans bio
 

1989 births
Living people
American football wide receivers
American male sprinters
USC Trojans men's track and field athletes
Athletes (track and field) at the 2012 Summer Olympics
Olympic silver medalists for the United States in track and field
Medalists at the 2012 Summer Olympics
Track and field athletes from Los Angeles
World Athletics Championships athletes for the United States
World Athletics Championships medalists
USC Sol Price School of Public Policy alumni
World Athletics Championships winners
Long Beach Polytechnic High School alumni